The Society for Name Studies in Britain and Ireland (SNSBI) is a learned society of members with interests in proper names, including place-names, personal names, and surnames relating to the British Isles.

The SNSBI is the successor to the Council for Name Studies in Great Britain and Ireland, which was set up in the 1960s to bring together scholars who were working in the field of onomastics in the British Isles.  As a result, the SNSBI was formally inaugurated in November 1991.

The SNSBI publishes the journal Nomina. It holds a day conference each autumn, as well as an annual weekend conference in spring. It has a website which provides details of past and future events, and of the articles in past issues of Nomina.

See also
Onomastics
British toponymy

References

External links
Society for Name Studies in Britain and Ireland

British toponymy
Irish toponymy
Learned societies of the United Kingdom
1991 establishments in the United Kingdom
Organizations established in 1991
Linguistic societies